Strombach is a river of North Rhine-Westphalia, Germany. It is a right tributary of the Agger.

Geography 
NN (7 ° 31'14 E, 51 ° 2'23 "N).

See also
List of rivers of North Rhine-Westphalia

References

Rivers of North Rhine-Westphalia
Rivers of Germany